Eddy Ferhi (born 26 November 1979) is a French retired professional ice hockey goaltender who participated at the 2010 IIHF World Championship as a member of the France National men's ice hockey team.

Awards and honours

References

External links

1979 births
Living people
Anglet Hormadi Élite players
Brûleurs de Loups players
Cincinnati Mighty Ducks players
French ice hockey goaltenders
San Diego Gulls (ECHL) players